Shankar Mudi is a Bengali Political drama film directed by Aniket Chattopadhyay and produced by Kaustuv Ray. This film was released on 15 March 2019 under the banner of RP Techvision India Private Limited. Bengali Actor-Director Shri Kaushik Ganguly plays the titular role.

Plot
This is a story of a small suburban locality of the Metro City Kolkata named Goragacha. The neighbourhood or in Bengali Para consists of a small grocery shop, run by its owner Shankar, a barber, a tea stall, a ladies tailor, a gents tailor and a local auto rickshaw driver. Amongst locals, there are a political leader or dada, a family whose only young youth was actively engaged in politics and subsequently died in a police encounter, a teacher, a live-in frustrated son-in-law and a Bahurupi. The story started with affectionate bondage between people in that big joint family like para, which slowly faced the fear of being extinct due to their financial stringency. As a part of advanced civilized modernisation which was an obvious effect of globalisation, a shopping mall emerged in their locality. Local residents slowly get accustomed with the central AC comfort, wide range of products, promotional techniques, acceptance of digital payments etc. of the local shopping mall which put a strong and uneven challenge of survival to local small scale business owners. They were losing their livelihood very fast. Shankar tried to cope-up with "mall effects" like keeping packet food grains, home delivery, introducing utility bill payments, even installing stand blower fan for his customers who in his version are his God. But all his and the entire neighbourhood's struggle gone in vain. Some leave, someone compromised their chastity, someone committed suicide after being defeated in this life struggle for survival. The plot clearly pinpoints the obvious negative impact of globalisation without having constructive governmental planning for saving medium or small-scale businesses.

Cast
 Kaushik Ganguly as Shankar Mudi
 Jisshu Sengupta as Live-in Son-in-Law
 Anjan Dutta as School Teacher
 Shantilal Mukherjee as Local Political Leader
 Saswata Chatterjee as Auto Rikshaw Driver
 Rudranil Ghosh as Bahurupi
 Kanchan Mullick as Barbar
 Sreela Majumdar as Wife of Shankar Mudi
 Biswanath Basu as Gents Tailor Owner
 Sampurna Lahiri
 Oindrila Saha
 Ankita Chakraborty as Ladies Tailor owner
 Malay Ghosh as Building Contractor of the Mall

References

External links
 

2019 films
Bengali-language Indian films
2010s Bengali-language films
2010s political drama films
Indian political drama films
Films directed by Aniket Chattopadhyay
2019 drama films